A.O. Near East B.C. is one of the oldest professional basketball clubs in Greece. The basketball club was founded in 1927. The team is located in Kaisariani, which is a suburb of the city of Athens. Near East's home arena, Near East Indoor Arena, is located only about 2 miles from the downtown center of Athens. It takes its name from the Near East Foundation.

History

Early history
Near East B.C. was one of the teams that participated in the first Pan-Hellenic Basketball tournament, which took place in Thessaloniki, Greece. In 1936, Near East B.C. won its first official Greek League championship, by defeating the University of Athens basketball team in Thessaloniki. To this day, this is still the only Greek national championship the club has won. In 1937, Near East B.C. finished second in the Greek League championship, as the University of Athens basketball club defeated them in the championship's final.

Recent history
In more recent times, the Near East basketball team struggled to hold on to its position in the top-tier-level league in Greece, the first division Greek Basket League. In 1998, the team won the top Greek pro league's second division championship, the Greek A2 League. The team participated in the European-wide 3rd-tier level FIBA Korać Cup, in the years 1999–00 and 2000–01. In 2001–02, the team competed in the Greek first division, for the last time in recent years.

Near East B.C. in international competitions

Arena
Near East plays its home domestic league games at the 1,300 seat Near East Indoor Arena.

Titles and honors
Domestic:
Greek League Champion:
1936
Greek 2nd Division Champion:
1998

Notable players

Greece:
  Antonis Asimakopoulos
  Marios Batis
  Dimitris Fosses
  Kostas Kaimakoglou
  Georgios Karagkoutis
  Nikos Papanikolopoulos
  Kostas Politis
  Christos Tapoutos
  Kostas Tsartsaris
  Nikos Vetoulas
  Vangelis Vourtzoumis
  Vassilis Xanthopoulos
 - Anatoly Zourpenko

USA:
  Anthony Bowie
  Lynn Greer
  Shawn Respert
  Randy White
  David Vaughn III

Rest of Americas:
  Andrés Guibert
  Ian Lockhart

Europe:
 - Franko Nakić

Oceania:
  Shane Heal

Head coaches
  Takis Koroneos

External links
Eurobasket.com Team Page

Basketball teams established in 1927
Basketball teams in Greece